Make a Wish (Intmanah) is a 2006 Palestinian-American short film by Cherien Dabis. It tells the story of Mariam, an 11-year-old Palestinian girl who faces enormous obstacles buying a birthday cake. It premiered at the 2007 Sundance Film Festival and received a number of awards at other festivals. It was released on DVD as a short for Dabis' 2009 feature film, Amreeka.

Cast
Mariam Mayar - Rantisse
Lama Lone-  Khilleh
Aida Iman - Aoun

Awards
2007 Aspen Shortsfest
Won: BAFTA/LA Award for Excellence - Honorable Mention 	
Won: Special Recognition 	

2007 Cairo International Film Festival for Children
Won: Ministry of Culture's Awards for Arabian Feature & Short Films 	
3rd place: Bronze Cairo - Best Short Film

2007 Chicago International Children's Film Festival
Won: Adult's Jury Award - Certificate of Merit 	Live-Action Short Film or Video
Won: Peace Prize 	

2007 Clermont-Ferrand International Short Film Festival
Won: Press Award - International Competition
Won: Special Mention of the Jury - International Competition

Notes

External links

Make A Wish Study Guide
Make A Wish at the UCLA Center for Near East Studies

2006 films
2006 drama films
2000s Arabic-language films
Israeli–Palestinian conflict films
Palestinian drama films
2006 short films